The tiny yellow bat (Rhogeessa minutilla) is a species of vesper bat. It is found in Colombia and Venezuela.

References

Rhogeessa
Bats of South America
Mammals of Colombia
Mammals of Venezuela
Vulnerable animals
Vulnerable biota of South America
Mammals described in 1897
Taxa named by Gerrit Smith Miller Jr.
Taxonomy articles created by Polbot